Shikarpur Assembly constituency is one of the 403 constituencies of the Uttar Pradesh Legislative Assembly, India. It is a part of the Bulandshahar district and one of the five assembly constituencies in the Bulandshahr Lok Sabha constituency. First election in this assembly constituency was held in 1957 after the "DPACO (1956)" (delimitation order) was passed in 1956. After the "Delimitation of Parliamentary and Assembly Constituencies Order" was passed in 2008, the constituency was assigned identification number 69. The constituency was not in existence from 1967 to 1973. In 1957, the constituency had two concurrent MLAs and the seat was reserved (till 2008) for candidates from SC  community.

Wards / Areas
Extent of Shikarpur Assembly constituency is Shikarpur Tehsil; PC Katiyawali of Jahangirabad KC of Anupshahr Tehsil.

Members of the Legislative Assembly

Election results

2022

2017
17th Vidhan Sabha

16th Vidhan Sabha: 2012 Assembly Elections

See also
Bulandshahar district
Bulandshahr Lok Sabha constituency
Sixteenth Legislative Assembly of Uttar Pradesh
Uttar Pradesh Legislative Assembly

References

External links
 

Assembly constituencies of Uttar Pradesh
Politics of Bulandshahr district
Constituencies established in 1956